Absecon is a city in Atlantic County, in the U.S. state of New Jersey. As of the 2020 United States Census, the city's population was 9,137, an increase of 726 (+8.6%) from the 2010 census count of 8,411, which in turn reflected an increase of 773 (+10.1%) from the 7,638 counted in the 2000 census.

The current City of Absecon was originally incorporated as a town by an act of the New Jersey Legislature on February 29, 1872, from portions of Egg Harbor Township and Galloway Township. Then on March 24, 1902, the City of Absecon replaced the town. The city is named for the Absegami tribe of Native Americans, from the word "Absogami", which means "little stream".

Geography
According to the United States Census Bureau, Absecon city had a total area of 7.22 square miles (18.69 km2), including 5.47 square miles (14.16 km2) of land and 1.75 square miles (4.53 km2) of water (24.22%).

The city borders the Atlantic County municipalities of Atlantic City, Egg Harbor Township, Galloway Township and Pleasantville.

Climate

Demographics

2010 census

The Census Bureau's 2006–2010 American Community Survey showed that (in 2010 inflation-adjusted dollars) median household income was $64,370 (with a margin of error of +/− $5,398) and the median family income was $77,784 (+/− $9,673). Males had a median income of $47,043 (+/− $7,593) versus $43,673 (+/− $3,797) for females. The per capita income for the borough was $31,194 (+/− $4,373). About 5.2% of families and 8.9% of the population were below the poverty line, including 10.4% of those under age 18 and 16.0% of those age 65 or over.

2000 census
As of the 2000 United States census there were 7,638 people, 2,773 households, and 2,085 families residing in the city. The racial makeup of the city was 83.31% White, 6.01% African American, 0.17% Native American, 7.46% Asian, 1.51% from other races, and 1.54% from two or more races. Hispanic or Latino of any race were 3.77% of the population.

There were 2,773 households, out of which 32.5% had children under the age of 18 living with them, 59.6% were married couples living together, 11.2% had a female householder with no husband present, and 24.8% were non-families. 19.2% of all households were made up of individuals, and 7.9% had someone living alone who was 65 years of age or older. The average household size was 2.69 and the average family size was 3.08.

In the city, the population was spread out, with 23.5% under the age of 18, 5.7% from 18 to 24, 29.6% from 25 to 44, 25.1% from 45 to 64, and 16.1% who were 65 years of age or older. The median age was 40 years. For every 100 females, there were 92.0 males. For every 100 females age 18 and over, there were 88.4 males.

The median income for a household in the city was $55,745, and the median income for a family was $61,563. Males had a median income of $47,984 versus $31,663 for females. The per capita income for the city was $23,615. About 3.2% of families and 4.8% of the population were below the poverty line, including 5.9% of those under age 18 and 4.3% of those age 65 or over.

Government

Local government 
Absecon operates under the City form of New Jersey municipal government. The city is one of 15 municipalities (of the 564) statewide that use this traditional form of government. The governing body is comprised of the Mayor and the seven-member City Council. The mayor is elected to a four-year term of office. The City Council is comprised of six members elected from the city's two wards to three-year terms on a staggered basis, with one seat from each ward up for election each year, along with one member elected at-large to a four-year term in office, all of whom are elected on a partisan basis as part of the November general election.

, the Mayor of Absecon is Democrat Kimberly Horton, the first female mayor in the town's history, serving a term of office ending December 31, 2024. Members of the Absecon City Council are Council President Elizabeth J. "Betty" Howell (D, 2023; Ward 1), Donald "Butch" Burroughs (D, 2023; Ward 2), Sandy Shenk Cain (D, 2024; Ward 2), Caleb N. Cavileer (D, 2022; Ward 2), Nicholas L. LaRotonda (R, 2024; Ward 1), Stephen Light (D, 2025; At Large) and Donna Poley (D, 2022; Ward 1. appointed to fill an unexpired term).

In September 2021, the City Council selected Donna Poley to fill the Ward 1 seat expiring in December 2022 that had been held by Keith C. Bennett until he resignedf from office.

In February 2019, the City Council appointed Ward 2 councilmember Kimberley Horton to fill the mayoral seat expiring in December 2020 that had been held by John Armstrong until he resigned from office. Horton served on an interim basis until the November 2019 general election when he was elected to serve the balance of the term of office. Later that month, Caleb Cavileer was chosen to fill Horton's vacant Ward 2 seat expiring in December 2020. In the November 2019 general election, Cavileer ran for and won a full three-year term and Butch Burroughs was elected to serve the balance of Horton's council term of office, while Horton was elected to complete the mayoral term.

Following the death of Ward 1 Councilmember Donald E. Camp in February 2016, Patrick Sheeran was selected from three candidates nominated by the Republican municipal committee and appointed to fill the vacant seat expiring in December 2016.

Federal, state and county representation 
Absecon is located in the 2nd Congressional district and is part of New Jersey's 2nd state legislative district.

 

Atlantic County is governed by a directly elected county executive and a nine-member Board of County Commissioners, responsible for legislation. The executive serves a four-year term and the commissioners are elected to staggered three-year terms, of which four are elected from the county on an at-large basis and five of the commissioners represent equally populated districts. , Atlantic County's Executive is Republican Dennis Levinson, whose term of office ends December 31, 2023. Members of the Board of County Commissioners are:

Ernest D. Coursey, District 1, including Atlantic City (part), Egg Harbor Township (part), and Pleasantville (D, 2022, Atlantic City), Chair Maureen Kern, District 2, including Atlantic City (part), Egg Harbor Township (part), Linwood, Longport, Margate City, Northfield, Somers Point and Ventnor City (R, 2024, Somers Point), Andrew Parker III, District 3, including Egg Harbor Township (part) and Hamilton Township (part) (R, Egg Harbor Township, 2023), Richard R. Dase, District 4, including Absecon, Brigantine, Galloway Township and Port Republic (R, 2022, Galloway Township), James A. Bertino, District 5, including Buena, Buena Vista Township, Corbin City, Egg Harbor City, Estell Manor, Folsom, Hamilton Township (part), Hammonton, Mullica Township and Weymouth Township (R, 2018, Hammonton), Caren L. Fitzpatrick, At-Large (D, 2023, Linwood), Frank X. Balles, At-Large (R, Pleasantville, 2024) Amy L. Gatto, Freeholder (R, 2022, Hamilton Township) and Vice Chair John W. Risley, At-Large (R, 2023, Egg Harbor Township) 

Atlantic County's constitutional officers are: 
County Clerk Joesph J. Giralo (R, 2026, Hammonton),  
Sheriff Eric Scheffler (D, 2024, Northfield) and 
Surrogate James Curcio (R, 2025, Hammonton).

Politics
As of March 2011, there were a total of 5,629 registered voters in Absecon City, of which 1,353 (24.0% vs. 30.5% countywide) were registered as Democrats, 1,716 (30.5% vs. 25.2%) were registered as Republicans and 2,557 (45.4% vs. 44.3%) were registered as Unaffiliated. There were 3 voters registered as Libertarians or Greens. Among the city's 2010 Census population, 66.9% (vs. 58.8% in Atlantic County) were registered to vote, including 84.5% of those ages 18 and over (vs. 76.6% countywide).

In the 2012 presidential election, Democrat Barack Obama received 2,172 votes (50.6% vs. 57.9% countywide), ahead of Republican Mitt Romney with 2,063 votes (48.1% vs. 41.1%) and other candidates with 43 votes (1.0% vs. 0.9%), among the 4,289 ballots cast by the city's 5,938 registered voters, for a turnout of 72.2% (vs. 65.8% in Atlantic County). In the 2008 presidential election, Republican John McCain received 2,262 votes (49.8% vs. 41.6% countywide), ahead of Democrat Barack Obama with 2,203 votes (48.5% vs. 56.5%) and other candidates with 41 votes (0.9% vs. 1.1%), among the 4,539 ballots cast by the city's 5,993 registered voters, for a turnout of 75.7% (vs. 68.1% in Atlantic County). In the 2004 presidential election, Republican George W. Bush received 2,177 votes (53.6% vs. 46.2% countywide), ahead of Democrat John Kerry with 1,800 votes (44.4% vs. 52.0%) and other candidates with 42 votes (1.0% vs. 0.8%), among the 4,058 ballots cast by the city's 5,201 registered voters, for a turnout of 78.0% (vs. 69.8% in the whole county).

In the 2013 gubernatorial election, Republican Chris Christie received 1,874 votes (65.0% vs. 60.0% countywide), ahead of Democrat Barbara Buono with 883 votes (30.6% vs. 34.9%) and other candidates with 33 votes (1.1% vs. 1.3%), among the 2,883 ballots cast by the city's 5,991 registered voters, yielding a 48.1% turnout (vs. 41.5% in the county). In the 2009 gubernatorial election, Republican Chris Christie received 1,501 votes (52.3% vs. 47.7% countywide), ahead of Democrat Jon Corzine with 1,195 votes (41.6% vs. 44.5%), Independent Chris Daggett with 133 votes (4.6% vs. 4.8%) and other candidates with 21 votes (0.7% vs. 1.2%), among the 2,872 ballots cast by the city's 5,770 registered voters, yielding a 49.8% turnout (vs. 44.9% in the county).

Education
The Absecon Public School District serve students in pre-kindergarten through eighth grade. As of the 2021–22 school year, the district, comprised of two schools, had an enrollment of 906 students and 87.0 classroom teachers (on an FTE basis), for a student–teacher ratio of 10.4:1. Schools in the district (with 2021–22 enrollment data from the National Center for Education Statistics.) are 
H. Ashton Marsh Elementary School with 513 students in grades PreK-4 and 
Emma C. Attales Middle School with 387 students in grades 5-8.

For ninth through twelfth grades, public school students from Absecon attend the Pleasantville High School in Pleasantville as part of a sending/receiving relationship with the Pleasantville Public Schools. As of the 2021–22 school year, the high school had an enrollment of 893 students and 72.5 classroom teachers (on an FTE basis), for a student–teacher ratio of 12.3:1. In 2020, the Absecon district submitted a petition to end its agreement with Pleasantville and send its students to Absegami High School under a new sending/receiving relationship with the Greater Egg Harbor Regional High School District that Absecon argues would give its students a better education at a lower cost, without negatively impacting the demographics in Pleasantville High School. About 10% of Absecon's graduating students have been choosing to attend Pleasantville High School, for which the Absecon district has been paying $18,000 per student each year.

City public school students are also eligible to attend the Atlantic County Institute of Technology in the Mays Landing section of Hamilton Township or the Charter-Tech High School for the Performing Arts, located in Somers Point.

Holy Spirit High School is a Roman Catholic high school, that operates under the jurisdiction of the Diocese of Camden. Established in Atlantic City in 1922, the school moved to Absecon in 1964.

Transportation

Roads and highways

Highways and roads in Absecon include U.S. Route 9, U.S. Route 30, Route 157 and County Route 585. The now-defunct Route 43 also passed through the city.

The Atlantic City Expressway and the Garden State Parkway are accessible outside the city in bordering Egg Harbor and Galloway Townships.

Public transportation

The Absecon station is served by NJ Transit's Atlantic City Line trains, with east-west service between 30th Street Station in Philadelphia and the Atlantic City Rail Terminal in Atlantic City.

NJ Transit provides bus service to and from Atlantic City on routes 508 (to the Hamilton Mall), 554 (to the Lindenwold PATCO station) and 559 (to Lakewood Township).

Notable people

People who were born in, residents of, or otherwise closely associated with Absecon include:

 Francis J. Blee (born 1958), member of the General Assembly who represented the 2nd Legislative District and served on the Absecon City Council from 1991–1995, serving as Absecon's youngest ever council president from 1992 to 1993
 Joe Callahan (born 1993), American football quarterback who played in the NFL for the Green Bay Packers
 Robert Irvine (born 1965), celebrity chef and television personality
 Brian Joo (born 1981), R&B and K-pop recording artist who was part of the duo Fly to the Sky
 Amy Kennedy (born 1978), educator, mental health advocate and Democratic nominee for New Jersey's 2nd congressional district in the 2020 elections
 Michelle Malkin (born 1970), columnist and political commentator
 Joseph McGahn (1917–1999), member of the New Jersey Senate who was a leading advocate of bringing casino gambling to Atlantic City
 Carol Plum-Ucci (born 1957), young adult novelist and essayist
 Cleon Throckmorton (1897–1965), painter and theatrical designer, producer, and architect

References

External links

 Absecon City web site
 Absecon Public Library
 Absecon Public School District
 
 School Data for the Absecon Public School District, National Center for Education Statistics
 The Current of Absecon – Local community newspaper

 
1872 establishments in New Jersey
Cities in Atlantic County, New Jersey
City form of New Jersey government
Populated places established in 1872